In mathematics (specifically in measure theory), a Radon measure, named after Johann Radon, is a measure on the σ-algebra of Borel sets of a Hausdorff topological space X that is finite on all compact sets, outer regular on all Borel sets, and inner regular on open sets. These conditions guarantee that the measure is  "compatible" with the topology of the space, and most measures used in mathematical analysis and in number theory are indeed Radon measures.

Motivation

A common problem is to find a good notion of a measure on a topological space that is compatible with the topology in some sense. One way to do this is to define a measure on the Borel sets of the topological space. In general there are several problems with this: for example, such a measure may not have a well defined support. Another approach to measure theory is to restrict to locally compact Hausdorff spaces, and only consider the measures that correspond to positive linear functionals on the space of continuous functions with compact support (some authors use this as the definition of a Radon measure). This produces a good theory with no pathological problems, but does not apply to spaces that are not locally compact. If there is no restriction to non-negative measures and complex measures are allowed, then Radon measures can be defined as the continuous dual space on the space of continuous functions with compact support. If such a Radon measure is real then it can be decomposed into the difference of two positive measures. Furthermore, an arbitrary Radon measure can be decomposed into four positive Radon measures, where the real and imaginary parts of the functional are each the differences of two positive Radon measures.

The theory of Radon measures has most of the good properties of the usual theory for locally compact spaces, but applies to all Hausdorff topological spaces. The idea of the definition of a Radon measure is to find some properties that characterize the measures on locally compact spaces corresponding to positive functionals, and use these properties as the definition of a Radon measure on an arbitrary Hausdorff space.

Definitions

Let m be a measure on the σ-algebra of Borel sets of a Hausdorff topological space X.

The measure m is called inner regular or tight if, for any open set U, m(U) is the supremum of m(K) over all compact subsets K of U.

The measure m is called outer regular if, for any Borel set B, m(B) is the infimum of m(U) over all open sets U containing B.

The measure m is called locally finite if every point of X has a neighborhood U for which m(U) is finite.

If m is locally finite, then it follows that m is finite on compact sets, and for locally compact Hausdorff spaces, the converse holds, too.
Thus, in this case, local finiteness may be equivalently replaced by finiteness on compact subsets.

The measure m is called a Radon measure if it is inner regular and locally finite.  In many situations, such as finite measures on locally compact spaces, this also implies outer regularity (see also Radon spaces).

(It is possible to extend the theory of Radon measures to non-Hausdorff spaces, essentially by replacing the word "compact" by "closed compact" everywhere. However, there seem to be almost no applications of this extension.)

Radon measures on locally compact spaces

When the underlying measure space is a locally compact topological space, the definition of a Radon measure can be expressed in terms of continuous linear functionals on the space of continuous functions  with compact support.

Measures

In what follows X denotes a locally compact topological space. The continuous real-valued functions with compact support on X form a vector space , which can be given a natural locally convex topology. Indeed,  is the union of the spaces  of continuous functions with support contained in compact sets K. Each of the spaces  carries naturally the topology of uniform convergence, which makes it into a Banach space. But as a union of topological spaces is a special case of a direct limit of topological spaces, the space  can be equipped with the direct limit locally convex topology induced by the spaces ; this topology is finer than the topology of uniform convergence.

If m is a Radon measure on  then the mapping

 

Continuity with respect to the direct limit topology defined above is equivalent to the following condition: for every compact subset K of X there exists a constant MK such that, for every continuous real-valued function f on X with support contained in K,

 
 
Conversely, by the Riesz–Markov–Kakutani representation theorem, each positive linear form on  arises as integration with respect to a unique regular Borel measure.

This gives an identification of real-valued Radon measures with the dual space of the locally convex space . These real-valued Radon measures need not be signed measures. For example, sin(x)dx is a real-valued Radon measure,  but is not even an extended signed measure as it cannot be written as the difference of two measures at least one of which is finite.

In this set-up it is common to use a terminology in which Radon measures in the above sense are called positive measures and real-valued Radon measures as above are called (real) measures.

Integration

To complete the buildup of measure theory for locally compact spaces from the functional-analytic viewpoint, it is necessary to extend measure (integral) from compactly supported continuous functions. This can be done for real or complex-valued functions in several steps as follows:
 Definition of the upper integral μ*(g) of a lower semicontinuous positive (real-valued) function g as the supremum (possibly infinite) of the positive numbers μ(h) for compactly supported continuous functions h ≤ g
 Definition of the upper integral μ*(f) for an arbitrary positive (real-valued) function f as the infimum of upper integrals μ*(g) for lower semi-continuous functions g ≥ f
 Definition of the vector space F = F(X, μ) as the space of all functions f on X for which the upper integral μ*(|f|) of the absolute value is finite; the upper integral of the absolute value defines a semi-norm on F, and F is a complete space with respect to the topology defined by the semi-norm
 Definition of the space L1(X, μ) of integrable functions as the closure inside F of the space of continuous compactly supported functions
 Definition of the integral for functions in L1(X, μ) as extension by continuity (after verifying that μ is continuous with respect to the topology of L1(X, μ))
 Definition of the measure of a set as the integral (when it exists) of the indicator function of the set.

It is possible to verify that these steps produce a theory identical with the one that starts from a Radon measure defined as a function that assigns a number to each Borel set of X.

The Lebesgue measure on R can be introduced by a few ways in this functional-analytic set-up. First, it is possibly to rely on an "elementary" integral such as the Daniell integral or the Riemann integral for integrals of continuous functions with compact support, as these are integrable for all the elementary definitions of integrals. The measure (in the sense defined above) defined by elementary integration is precisely the Lebesgue measure. Second, if one wants to avoid reliance on Riemann or Daniell integral or other similar theories, it is possible to develop first the general theory of Haar measures and define the Lebesgue measure as the Haar measure λ on R that satisfies the normalisation condition λ([0,1]) = 1.

Examples

The following are all examples of Radon measures:
 Lebesgue measure on Euclidean space (restricted to the Borel subsets);
 Haar measure on any locally compact topological group;
 Dirac measure on any topological space;
 Gaussian measure on Euclidean space  with its Borel sigma algebra;
 Probability measures on the σ-algebra of Borel sets of any Polish space. This example not only generalizes the previous example, but includes many measures on non-locally compact spaces, such as Wiener measure on the space of real-valued continuous functions on the interval [0,1].

The following are not examples of Radon measures:
Counting measure on Euclidean space is an example of a measure that is not a Radon measure, since it is not locally finite.
See .
 Let X be the interval [0, 1) equipped with the topology generated by the collection of half open intervals . This topology is sometimes called Sorgenfrey line. On this topological space, standard Lebesgue measure is not Radon since it is not inner regular, since compact sets are at most countable.
Then no measure which vanishes at points on Z is a Radon measure, since any compact set in Z is countable.

We note that, intuitively, the Radon measure is useful in mathematical finance particularly for working with Lévy processes because it has the properties of both Lebesgue and Dirac measures, as unlike the Lebesgue, a Radon measure on a single point is not necessarily of measure 0.

Basic properties

Moderated Radon measures
Given a Radon measure m on a space X, we can define another measure M (on the Borel sets) by putting

The measure M is outer regular, and locally finite, and inner regular for open sets. It coincides with m on compact and open sets, and m can be reconstructed from M as the unique inner regular measure that is the same as M on compact sets. The measure m is called moderated if M is σ-finite; in this case the measures m and M are the same. (If m is σ-finite this does not imply that M is σ-finite, so being moderated is stronger than being σ-finite.)

On a hereditarily Lindelöf space every Radon measure is moderated.

The topological space X has as underlying set the subset of the real plane given by the y-axis of points (0,y) together with the points (1/n,m/n2) with m,n positive integers. The topology is given as follows. The single points (1/n,m/n2) are all open sets. A base of neighborhoods of the point (0,y) is given by wedges consisting of  all points in X of the form (u,v) with |v − y| ≤ |u| ≤ 1/n for a positive integer n. This space X is locally compact. The measure m is given by letting the y-axis have measure 0 and letting the point (1/n,m/n2) have measure 1/n3. This measure is inner regular and locally finite, but is not outer regular as any open set containing the y-axis has measure infinity. In particular the y-axis has m-measure 0 but M-measure infinity.

Radon spaces

A topological space is called a Radon space if every finite Borel measure is a Radon measure, and strongly Radon if every locally finite Borel measure is a Radon measure. Any Suslin space is strongly Radon, and moreover every Radon measure is moderated.

Duality

On a locally compact Hausdorff space, Radon measures correspond to positive linear functionals on the space of continuous functions with compact support. This is not surprising as this property is the main motivation for the definition of Radon measure.

Metric space structure

The pointed cone  of all (positive) Radon measures on  can be given the structure of a complete metric space by defining the Radon distance between two measures  to be

This metric has some limitations.

is not sequentially compact with respect to the Radon metric: i.e., it is not guaranteed that any sequence of probability measures will have a subsequence that is convergent with respect to the Radon metric, which presents difficulties in certain applications. On the other hand, if  is a compact metric space, then the 
Wasserstein metric turns  into a compact metric space.

Convergence in the Radon metric implies weak convergence of measures:

but the converse implication is false in general. Convergence of measures in the Radon metric is sometimes known as strong convergence, as contrasted with weak convergence.

See also

References

 
 Functional-analytic development of the theory of Radon measure and integral on locally compact spaces.
 
 Haar measure; Radon measures on general Hausdorff spaces and equivalence between the definitions in terms of linear functionals and locally finite inner regular measures on the Borel sigma-algebra.
 
 Contains a simplified version of Bourbaki's approach, specialised to measures defined on separable metrizable spaces .
 .

External links
 

Measures (measure theory)
Integral representations
Lp spaces